The 1943 Massachusetts State Aggies football team was to represent Massachusetts State College in the 1943 college football season. Mass State did not field an official varsity football team during this season as most able-bodied men of college age were serving in the U.S. Armed Forces during World War II.

References

Massachusetts State
UMass Minutemen football seasons
Massachusetts State Aggies football